Bingöl University is a university located in Bingöl, Turkey. It was established in 2007. The University is led by Prof. Dr. İbrahim Çapak. Bingol University, Web of Science database, according to 2019 data, 108 state universities in terms of number of publications per faculty member in Turkey has a performance ranking #6 ranking.

History 
Bingol University was founded as an institution which contributes to the higher education in the Turkish Republic. Initially the university consisted of 3 faculties, 2 institutes, and 2 vocational schools. Later on, the university expanded its activities to 10 faculties, 6 vocational schools, and 5 institutes. At the university, over 15'000 alumni attend classes at the undergraduate, bachelor and graduate level.

In 2011 the whole Bingöl University campus was redesigned by Günay Erdem, landscape architect Serpil Öztekin Erdem and landscape architect Sunay Erdem and took its current state.

Faculties
 Faculty of Sciences and Letters
 Faculty of Economics and administrative Sciences
 Faculty of Theology
 Faculty of Engineering and Architecture
 Faculty of Agriculture
 Faculty of Veterinary Medicine
 Faculty of Arts and Sciences
 Faculty of Health Sciences
 Faculty of Sports Science

Institutes
 Institute of  Sciences
 Institute of Health Sciences
 Institute of Social Sciences
 Institute of Living Languages Sciences
 Institute of Recitat

Vocational schools
 Food, Agriculture and Livestock School
 Genç Vocational School
 Health Services Vocational School
 Solhan Health Services Vocational School
 Technical Science Vocational School
 Social Sciences Vocational School

Affiliations
The university is a member of the Caucasus University Association.

References

Universities and colleges in Turkey
Educational institutions established in 2007
State universities and colleges in Turkey
2007 establishments in Turkey
Bingöl Province